Cohee—also spelled coohee, kohee, quohee—was a name that Irish, Scotch-Irish and German immigrants to the colonial-era Southern United States gave themselves. They settled in the Shenandoah Valley and differentiated themselves from the Anglican planters of eastern Virginia who were called Tuckahoes. The Cohees were the first Europeans to settle in what are now Amherst County and Nelson County, Virginia.

The word comes from the Scots and Ulster Scots phrase "quo he", which corresponds to "quoth he" in standard English. It has come to mean "a backwoods settler of Scots or northern Irish origin". It primarily refers to inhabitants who lived west of the Blue Ridge Mountains in what is now West Virginia. The term also applied to German, Scottish, or Irish people in Pennsylvania.

References

Pre-statehood history of Virginia
Pre-statehood history of North Carolina
Pre-statehood history of South Carolina
Pre-statehood history of West Virginia
History of the Southern United States
Virginia society
People of Virginia in the American Civil War
Scotch-Irish American culture in South Carolina
Scotch-Irish American culture in North Carolina
Scotch-Irish American culture in Virginia
Scotch-Irish American culture in West Virginia
Scotch-Irish American history
North Carolina society
South Carolina society
West Virginia society
American regional nicknames